Semicalamidia is a monotypic moth genus in the family Erebidae erected by Rob de Vos in 2012. Its only species, Semicalamidia owgarra, was described by George Thomas Bethune-Baker in 1908. It is found in Papua New Guinea where its habitat consists of mountainous areas.

References

Lithosiina
Moths described in 1908
Monotypic moth genera
Moths of New Guinea